"(At Your Best) You Are Love" is a song by the Isley Brothers, originally a radio hit in 1976. It was originally dedicated to their mother.

Personnel
Ronald Isley: lead vocals, background vocals
O'Kelly Isley, Jr.: background vocals
Rudolph Isley: background vocals
Ernie Isley: electric guitar, acoustic guitars, drums, background vocals 
Marvin Isley: bass played by, background vocals 
Chris Jasper: acoustic piano, electric piano, keyboards, synthesizers, background vocals
Produced, written, composed and arranged by The Isley Brothers and Chris Jasper

Aaliyah version

"(At Your Best) You Are Love" was covered by American singer Aaliyah for her debut studio album, Age Ain't Nothing but a Number (1994). The cover, titled "At Your Best (You Are Love)", was released as the second single from Age Ain't Nothing but a Number on August 22, 1994, by Blackground Records and Jive Records. A commercial success, it peaked at number six on the US Billboard Hot 100 and number two on the Hot R&B/Hip-Hop Songs. Soon after its release, it was certified gold by the Recording Industry Association of America (RIAA).

Critical reception
"At Your Best (You Are Love)" received widespread critical acclaim. Damien Scott from Complex felt that the song was a nice departure from the hip hop and new jack swing–inspired songs that comprised a large portion of Age Ain't Nothing but a Number. He said that the song showed Aaliyah was "on the cusp of adulthood". In his weekly UK chart commentary, James Masterton wrote, "Her second hit is in essence a beauty, a sparse but haunting rendition of an old Isley Brothers track, first written and recorded before she was even born." Alan Jones from Music Week gave it three out of five, adding that "this pretty Isley Brothers ballad is played on traditional instruments, and is sung by the striking young R Kelly protege in intimate and breathily pure style." 

MTV.com felt that "(At Your Best) You Are Love" was one of the album's highlights, along with "Young Nation," "Age Ain't Nothing But A Number" and "Down With The Clique". 
 In a retrospective review, Cydney Lee from  Billboard praised Aaliyah's vocal delivery on the song and felt that she maintained the original song's  "depth with a sense of maturity and grace that defined her emerging class of young R&B stars, like Brandy and Monica, at the time".

Music video
The accompanying music video for "At Your Best (You Are Love)" was directed by Millicent Shelton. It was shot back-to-back with R. Kelly's "Summer Bunnies" and both were released during the fall of 1994. The video uses the remix of the song and features Kelly, who produced it, in the video. It was published on YouTube in October 2009. As of September 2021, the video has amassed over 15 million views.

Track listings and formats

 US 12-inch vinyl
 "At Your Best (You Are Love)" (Gangstar Child Remix) – 4:30
 "At Your Best (You Are Love)" (Stepper's Ball Remix) – 3:05
 "At Your Best (You Are Love)" (album version) – 4:43
 "At Your Best (You Are Love)" (Gangstar Child Remix) (instrumental) – 4:30

 US cassette single
 "At Your Best (You Are Love)" (album version) – 4:43
 "At Your Best (You Are Love)" (Gangstar Child Remix) – 4:30
 "At Your Best (You Are Love)" (Stepper's Ball Remix) – 3:05

 US maxi CD single
 "At Your Best (You Are Love)" (album version) – 4:43
 "At Your Best (You Are Love)" (Gangstar Child Remix) – 4:30
 "At Your Best (You Are Love)" (Stepper's Ball Remix) – 3:05
 "Back & Forth" (Ms. Mello Radio Mix) – 3:50

 UK 12-inch vinyl
 "At Your Best (You Are Love)" (Gangstar Child Remix) – 4:30
 "At Your Best (You Are Love)" (Stepper's Ball Remix) – 3:05
 "At Your Best (You Are Love)" (album version) – 4:43
 "At Your Best (You Are Love)" (UK Flavour Stepper's Mix) – 4:55
 "At Your Best (You Are Love)" (UK Flavour) – 4:57

 UK cassette and Japanese mini CD singles
 "At Your Best (You Are Love)" (album version) – 4:43
 "At Your Best (You Are Love)" (Gangstar Child Remix) – 4:30

 UK maxi CD single
 "At Your Best (You Are Love)" (no intro) – 4:12
 "At Your Best (You Are Love)" (Gangstar Child Remix) – 4:30
 "At Your Best (You Are Love)" (Stepper's Ball Remix) – 3:05
 "At Your Best (You Are Love)" (UK Flavour) – 4:57
 "At Your Best (You Are Love)" (UK Flavour Stepper's Mix) – 4:55
 "At Your Best (You Are Love)" (album version) – 4:43

Credits and personnel
Credits are adapted from the liner notes of Age Ain't Nothing but a Number.
 Aaliyah – lead vocals, backing vocals
 R. Kelly – multi-instrumentation, production

Charts

Weekly charts

Year-end charts

Certifications

Release history

Notes

Other versions
In the Philippines, the Aaliyah's version was covered by two artists: MYMP on their album Versions and Nina from her love songs live album Nina Live!.
Swedish artist El Perro Del Mar covered the song in 2009 as a special Record Store Day release as well.
In 2010, Drake made a song with Young Jeezy called "Unforgettable" using the same beat.
As well as "Activist" Written By Gucci Mane & Peewee Longway: Release Date, August 13, 2013
In 2015, Frank Ocean released a cover (You are Luhh) on his Tumblr account as a tribute to Aaliyah, one day after what would have been her 36th birthday. A slightly different version was also included on his visual album Endless.
In 2021, English singer Sinéad Harnett covered the song with a new music video to tribute to Aaliyah's version of the song.

Samples
Tamar Braxton sampled the song in her single with Future, "Let Me Know".

References

External links
 

1975 songs
1994 singles
Aaliyah songs
The Isley Brothers songs
Soul ballads
Rhythm and blues ballads
Songs written by Chris Jasper
Song recordings produced by R. Kelly
Songs written by Marvin Isley
Songs written by Ernie Isley
Songs written by Rudolph Isley
Songs written by O'Kelly Isley Jr.
Songs written by Ronald Isley
1970s ballads